Ahmos Zu-Bolton II (October 21, 1948 – March 8, 2005) was an activist, poet and playwright also known for his editing and publishing endeavors on behalf of African-American culture.

Life
Born in Poplarville, Mississippi, Zu-Bolton grew up in DeRidder, Louisiana, near the Texas border. In 1965 he was one of several black students who integrated Louisiana State University in Baton Rouge. After serving in the U.S. Army in Vietnam, Zu-Bolton founded Hoo-Doo, a magazine devoted to African-American activism and arts, published A Niggered Amen: Poems, and coedited Synergy D.C. Anthology, in 1975. He also opened the Copestetic Bookstore on Marigny Street in New Orleans, LA.

While living in New Orleans he taught English, African-American Studies, and Creative Writing classes at Xavier University, Tulane University and Delgado Community College. He was Visiting Writer in Residence at University of Missouri.

Death
Ahmos Zu-Bolton died March 8, 2005, in Washington, D.C., of cancer.

Bibliography

References

1948 births
2005 deaths
People from Poplarville, Mississippi
African-American poets
United States Army personnel of the Vietnam War
20th-century American poets
Writers from Mississippi
20th-century American dramatists and playwrights
Writers from Louisiana
People from DeRidder, Louisiana
Louisiana State University alumni
Xavier University of Louisiana faculty
Tulane University faculty
University of Missouri faculty
Deaths from cancer in Washington, D.C.
African-American dramatists and playwrights
United States Army soldiers
20th-century African-American writers
21st-century African-American people